Umair Jaswal is a Pakistani actor, singer-songwriter and music producer from Islamabad. 

He was also lead vocalist of the rock band Qayaas. 

Umair is the brother of singers Yasir Jaswal and Uzair Jaswal.

Personal life 
Jaswal, whose father is "one of the best scientists in Pakistan", initially studied dentistry before switching to geology, but always kept an interest in the arts during all these academic years, in music by joining a band and in acting by doing theater plays.

He completed his schooling from IMCB F-10/3 Islamabad.

On October 20, 2020 it was announced that he has married Pakistani actress Sana Javed.

Career

Music 

Jaswal started his career in 2008 by joining the rock band Qayaas and gained popularity in 2009 with the song Tanha and Umeed. 

He joined Coke Studio season 5 with his band in 2012 and performed the song Charkha Nolakha with Atif Aslam. Qayaas released their debut album Uss Paar in 2011 with Umair as a lead vocalist. The songs Halaak and Inquilaab from the album were featured in the film Waar. In Coke Studio season 6, Umair decided to go solo. He performed the song Khayal on the first episode of Coke Studio season 6 which was also featured in film Waar.

In 2013 Umair was nominated as Pakistan's youth ambassador by the International Human Rights Commission.

In Coke Studio season 8 Umair performed the song Sammi Meri Waar with QB which received more than two million views in two weeks. In an interview to The Express Tribune he told that he also received hate mails after release of the song. Umair said: "Man! I’ve received audio messages from places like Iraq. The main idea behind doing this song was to penetrate a bigger market and fortunately that is exactly what happened".

Acting 
Umair made his acting debut on television by appearing in the serial Mor Mahal (2016), playing the lead role of a nawab alongside Meesha Shafi. In an interview Jaswal said, "I'm honored to be a part of the biggest Pakistani television production to date. I’m sharing the screen with some of the best actors in the industry. Sarmad is a phenomenal storyteller and Sarmad Sehbai a wordsmith second to none. I can’t wait to share the project with the viewers."

A year later, in 2017, Umair made his Lollywood debut in the war epic film Yalghaar as Captain Umair.

Discography 
Coke Studio songs

Being one of the promising artist of Coke Studio, Umair has performed below songs with the grate platform.
 Charkla Nolaka – Coke Studio Season 5
 Khayaal – Coke Studio Season 6
 Sammi Meri Waar – Coke Studio Season 8
 Khaki Banda – Coke Studio Season 9
 Sasu Mangay – Coke Studio Season 9
 Dam Mast Qalandar – Coke Studio Season 10
Chal Raha Hoon – Coke Studio Season 12
Har Funn Maula - Coke Studio Season 13

First solo album
 Na Rahoon – New single released from most waited solo album of Umair Jaswal, featuring Faraz Anwar on lead guitar. The music video was directed by his brother and director Yasir Jaswal. The full album was scheduled to release in 2018.

Filmography 
Television

Film

See also 
 Qayaas
 Coke Studio (Pakistan)

References

External links 

Living people
Pakistani male singers
Pakistani songwriters
People from Islamabad
Pakistani rock musicians
Pakistani pop singers
Pakistani heavy metal singers
Pakistani television actors
Pakistani film actors
1986 births